Matt Ford, known professionally as Pinky Beecroft, is an Australian singer-songwriter, performer and screenwriter. From 1997 to 2005 he was the lead singer and keyboardist for alternative rockers, Machine Gun Fellatio. His group Pinky Beecroft and the White Russians released an album, Somethin' Somewhere Better, in August 2008. As a songwriter he co-wrote, "No Aphrodisiac" (December 1997), with bandmate Chit Chat Von Loopin Stab and The Whitlams' Tim Freedman. At the ARIA Music Awards of 1998 it won Song of the Year for The Whitlams.

Music

He was the lead singer and songwriter of Australian band Machine Gun Fellatio. He quit the band in 2005, at which point the group split up. He is the lead singer of Pinky Beecroft & The White Russians. and has released a self-titled EP and a full-length album entitled Somethin' Somewhere better and Pretty Black.
He made a number of appearances on the ABC television series The Glass House.

He has also appeared on the Network Ten series The Panel, as well as In Siberia Tonight on SBS-TV.

Beecroft co-wrote the song "No Aphrodisiac" (credited as Matt Ford). The song was recorded by The Whitlams and went on to win an ARIA Award for Song of the Year.

Writing
Under his birthname, Matt Ford, he has written for a number of TV series, including Farscape, a popular US-Australian TV series broadcast on the Sci-Fi channel, and Sweat, which starred Heath Ledger.
His writing credits also include the long-running Australian series Stingers, Love Is a Four Letter Word, Medivac, Wildside, G.P., and Lochie Leonard.
He was the writer of ROAD, a telefeature for SBS Independent, produced by Enda Murray and Lisa Duff and using an all-indigenous Australian cast and crew. It screened on SBS-TV.
He wrote the screenplay for the documentary feature Killing Priscilla, directed by Academy-Award winner Lizzie Gardiner and screened in Australia, the UK and the US.
His writing credits also include Frankies House, (an Australian-US-UK co-production),  Sea Patrol, and the Showtime series Satisfaction. He was also referenced in the Satisfaction episode "Pony Girl"; while Heather is watching the film clip to the song "Roller Coaster" by MGF, she mentions that the lead singer thinks she's paranoid.

His feature film screenplays include Prodigal Son and Twisted Sister.

He was a writer and producer of ABC TV's Love Is a Four Letter Word.

He co-wrote the book A Grown-up Guy's Guide to Life with Joan Sauers.

His short stories were featured in the marketing campaign for the most recent Elle Macpherson lingerie range.

He hosts the WPA World Nine-ball Championship on ABC-TV and is currently working with Chaser member Charles Firth on his satire driven Manic Times.

Awards and nominations
With Machine Gun Fellatio Ford/Beecroft was nominated for an ARIA Award for Best New Song for "The Girl of My Dreams Is Giving Me Nightmares"  in 2003

References

External links
 
 Pinky Beecroft & The White Russians

1965 births
Australian rock singers
Living people
Machine Gun Fellatio members